Oneirology is the fifth studio album by American hip hop group CunninLynguists, released in 2011. It peaked at number 34 on the Billboard Heatseekers Albums chart, as well as number 69 on the Top R&B/Hip-Hop Albums chart.

Background
All that was known about Oneirology throughout most of 2010 was the name, but details were finally announced in January 2011 by HipHopDX, followed by the album cover and track listing, respectively. In the official website of QN5 Music, the production was announced, and was just by the member Kno.

The album cover was designed by the Dutch artist Lois van Baarle.

Critical reception
Andres Tardio of HipHopDX gave the album a 3.5 out of 5, saying, "This project combines creative sounds with inventive rhymes and stands as an example of how a great group can come together to craft a well-made album worthy of praise." He added, "Using their attention to detail on this release, they've managed to build on an already impressive catalog of music and it will not disappoint too many longtime supporters of the crew."

PopMatters listed it as the 6th best hip hop album of 2011.

Track listing
Credits adapted from the CD liner notes.

Personnel
Credits adapted from the CD liner notes.
 Kno – production
 Blue Sky Black Death – co-production (11, 15)
 Deacon the Villain – additional keyboards (4, 5, 8, 14)
 Courtney Campbell – additional vocals (8)
 Rick Warren – additional vocals (9)
 Willie Eames – guitar
 DJ FlipFlop – turntables
 Change – mastering
 Lois van Baarle – artwork
 Kontrast – design, layout

Charts

References

External links
 

2011 albums
CunninLynguists albums
Albums produced by Blue Sky Black Death